Appelbach is a river of Rhineland-Palatinate, Germany.

The Appelbach springs north of Falkenstein. It discharges at Bretzenheim from the right into the Nahe.

See also
List of rivers of Rhineland-Palatinate

References

Rivers of Rhineland-Palatinate
Rivers of Germany